Calm was an American hip hop group from Denver, Colorado. It consisted of Time and AwareNess. The duo released their album Anti-Smiles in 2006.

History
In 2006, Calm released Anti-Smiles. Jordan Selbo of Rap Reviews gave the album 7 out of 10. Tom Murphy of Westword gave it a favorable review, writing: "Although Anti-Smiles reflects the dark side of our collective psyche, it's also a statement of hope in the face of fear and self-doubt." It was named the intellectual hip-hop album of the year by Hip-Hop Linguistics.

In 2008, Calm performed in a hip-hop show along with Reflect June, Tullie, Ancient Mith, and Mr. Dibbs.

Calm's last reported performance was in 2010, introducing a song by Time called "Pink UFO", in support of a Denver ballot initiative to create an Extraterrestrial Affairs Commission.

Discography

Studio albums
Anti-Smiles (2006)
Things I Learned While Dying in Denver (2018)

Compilation appearances
"Treat Me Like a Villain" on Offbeaters Vol. 3 (2006)
"Depression" on Calderas of Mind (2006)

References

External links
 

Alternative hip hop groups
American musical duos
American hip hop groups
Musical groups from Denver